North Acton Halt railway station served the North Acton area of Acton, London, England, from 1904 to 1913 on the Acton-Northolt line.

History
The station was opened on 1 May 1904 by the Great Western Railway. It was a short-lived station, closing on 1 February 1913.

References

Disused railway stations in the London Borough of Ealing
Former Great Western Railway stations
Railway stations in Great Britain opened in 1904
Railway stations in Great Britain closed in 1913
1904 establishments in England
1913 disestablishments in England